Indo-1 is a popular calcium indicator similar to Fura-2.  In contrast to Fura-2, Indo-1 has a dual emissions peak. The main emission peak in calcium-free solution is 475 nm while in the presence of calcium the emission is shifted to 400 nm. It is widely used in flow cytometry.
The penta potassium salt is commercially available and preferred to the free acid because of its higher solubility in water. While Indo-1 is not cell permeable the penta acetoxymethyl ester Indo-1 AM enters the cell where it is cleaved by intracellular esterases to Indo-1.
The synthesis and properties of Indo-1 were presented in 1985 by the group of Roger Y Tsien.

References

External links
 Lars Jenne - Intracellular Calcium Release

Biochemistry methods
Cell imaging
Chelating agents
Fluorescent dyes